Beauveria is a genus of asexually-reproducing fungi allied with the ascomycete family Cordycipitaceae. Its several species are typically insect pathogens. The sexual states (teleomorphs) of Beauveria species, where known, are species of Cordyceps.

Beauveria species are white entomopathogenic fungi. They form unicellular conidia that are typically hydrophobic and very small. The conidia are formed holoblastically from basally inflated conidiogenous cells. After conidium production, the conidiogenous cell elongates before producing another conidium atop a small denticle (a narrow projection bearing a conidium or sporangium). The result is the formation of a distinctive, slender, zig-zag rachis. Colonies of Beauveria species are typically white or off-white on artificial culture media.

Species of Tritirachium resemble Beauveria species in having a zig-zag conidiogenous cells, but differ in lacking conspicuous denticles and in producing yellow-brown to purple colonies.

Beauveria species are commonly found associated with insects or habitats supporting insects, including soil and private dwellings. B. bassiana, the most widely known member of this genus, has been developed as a biological pesticide for various insect pests.

Species

A multilocus phylogeny of Beauveria based on partial sequences of RPB1, RPB2, TEF and the nuclear intergenic region, Bloc, has been described to assess diversity within the genus and to evaluate the taxonomic status of species.  B. bassiana and B. brongniartii, both of which represent species complexes and which previously lacked type specimens, were redescribed and types are proposed in this paper. In addition six new species were described including B. varroae and B. kipukae, which form a biphyletic, morphologically cryptic sister lineage to B. bassiana.  B. sungii is an Asian species that is linked to an undetermined species of Cordyceps. The combination B. amorpha was considered validly published; previous literature also refers to invalid B. felina and B. globulifera.

 List of Beauveria species
 Beauveria alba
 Beauveria amorpha
 Beauveria arenaria
 Beauveria asiatica
 Beauveria australis
 Beauveria bassiana
 Beauveria brongniartii
 Beauveria brumptii
 Beauveria caledonica
 Beauveria chiromensis
 Beauveria coccorum
 Beauveria cretacea
 Beauveria cylindrospora
 Beauveria delacroixii
 Beauveria densa
 Beauveria dependens
 Beauveria doryphorae
 Beauveria effusa
 Beauveria epigaea
 Beauveria felina
 Beauveria geodes 
 Beauveria globulifera
 Beauveria heimii
 Beauveria hoplocheli
 Beauveria kipukae
 Beauveria laxa
 Beauveria malawiensis
 Beauveria medogensis
 Beauveria melolonthae
 Beauveria nubicola
 Beauveria oryzae
 Beauveria paradoxa
 Beauveria paranensis
 Beauveria parasitica
 Beauveria petelotii 
 Beauveria pseudobassiana
 Beauveria rileyi
 Beauveria rubra
 Beauveria shiotae
 Beauveria sobolifera
 Beauveria spicata 
 Beauveria stephanoderis
 Beauveria sulfurescens
 Beauveria sungii
 Beauveria tenella
 Beauveria tundrensis
 Beauveria velata
 Beauveria varroae
 Beauveria vermiconia
 Beauveria vexans
 Beauveria viannai
 Beauveria virella

B. simplex is now Acrodontium simplex; B. nivea is Tolypocladium inflatum.

References

Sordariomycetes genera
Clavicipitaceae